This is a list of presidents of Cameroon since the country gained independence from France in 1960 to the present day. A total of two people have served as President of Cameroon. The current President of Cameroon is Paul Biya, since 6 November 1982.

List of officeholders

Political parties

Officeholders

Timeline

See also
Cameroon
President of Cameroon
Prime Minister of Cameroon 
List of prime ministers of Cameroon
List of colonial governors of Cameroon
List of heads of government of French Cameroon
List of heads of government of British Cameroons
Politics of Cameroon 
Lists of office-holders

External links
Official Website
World Statesmen – Cameroon

Cameroon
 
Politics of Cameroon
Presidents
Presidents